Events from the year 1954 in Iran.

Incumbents
 Shah: Mohammad Reza Pahlavi 
 Prime Minister: Fazlollah Zahedi

Events

August
 Great Iran Flood kills about 10,000 people.

November

Death of Hossein Fatemi

References

 
Iran
Years of the 20th century in Iran
1950s in Iran
Iran